The 2005 Copa Indonesia was the first edition of Piala Indonesia, the nationwide football cup tournament in Indonesia, involving clubs from Premier Division, First Division and Second Division. The winner of the tournament qualified to play for 2006 AFC Champions League.

Arema Malang became champions after a victory over Persija Jakarta in the final match at Gelora Bung Karno Stadium, Jakarta.

First round

Region I 

|}

Region II 

|}

Region III 

|}

Region IV 

|}

Region V 

|}

Region VI 

|}

Region VII 

|}

Region VIII 

|}

Second round 

|}

Third round 

|}

Quarterfinal 

|}

Semifinal 

|}

Final

References

External links
Official site Liga Indonesia

2005
Copa Indonesia
Copa Indonesia
2005–06 in Indonesian football